Hillmen of the Trollshaws is a 1984 fantasy role-playing game supplement published by Iron Crown Enterprises for Middle-earth Role Playing.

Contents
Hillmen of the Trollshaws is a module set in Rhudaur, a former Dunedain kingdom now controlled by the Witch-king of Angmar.

Reception
Andy Blakeman reviewed Hillmen of the Trollshaws for Imagine magazine, and stated that "Hillmen of the Trolls haws features Cameth Brin, a fortress built into a rocky outcrop, which protects a deserted town in its shadow. Explorations of Cameth Brin are obviously called for, and who could refuse the challenge?"

J. Michael Caparula reviewed Hillmen of the Trollshaws in The Space Gamer No. 76. Caparula commented that "I found Hillmen of the Trollshaws to be a good value for [the price]. if you use the 'Trollshaws' adventure in the original MERP rules as a jumping-off point, you'll find this module useful for continuing the campaign in the same area. Cameth Brin is a worthy enough conception to be used in any fantasy campaign, MERP or otherwise."

References

Middle-earth Role Playing supplements
Role-playing game supplements introduced in 1984